Robert William Haines Moline  (20 October 18898 August 1979) was an Anglican bishop.

Moline was born at Sudbury, Suffolk (where his father was Rector) and educated at The King's School, Canterbury and Emmanuel College, Cambridge. Decorated for World War I service with the Rifle Brigade, he was made deacon on Trinity Sunday 1920 (30 May) and ordained priest the following Trinity Sunday (22 May 1921), both times by Arthur Winnington-Ingram, Bishop of London, at St Paul's Cathedral. He began his ministry with a curacy at St Matthew's, Bethnal Green after which he joined the Brotherhood of St Barnabas in North Queensland. He was its Warden from 1925 to 1927 and was the Archdeacon of the area until 1929. Returning to England he was Rector of North Cadbury then of Poplar. From 1940 until 1947 he was Vicar of St Paul's Knightsbridge when he became Archbishop of Perth, a position he held until his retirement in 1962. He was consecrated a bishop on 25 April 1947, by Geoffrey Fisher, Archbishop of Canterbury, at Westminster Abbey; he died at Coulsdon, Greater London.

References

1889 births
People from Sudbury, Suffolk
People educated at The King's School, Canterbury
Alumni of Emmanuel College, Cambridge
British Army personnel of World War I
Recipients of the Military Cross
Holders of a Lambeth degree
Anglican archdeacons in Australia
Anglican archbishops of Perth
20th-century Anglican archbishops
1979 deaths